Zarkhu may refer to:
 Zarkhu, Azerbaijan
 Zarkhu, Iran